Pingasa cornivalva is a moth of the family Geometridae first described by Wiltshire in 1982. It is found in Saudi Arabia.

References

Moths described in 1982
Pseudoterpnini